Starzak is a surname. Notable people with the surname include:

Marcin Starzak (born 1985), Polish long jumper
Richard Starzak (born 1959), British animator

Polish-language surnames